Baku Zoo is a state zoological park in Baku, Azerbaijan. Established in 1928, it is the country's oldest zoo. It is owned and managed by the Ministry of Culture and Tourism of Azerbaijan and the Mayoralty of Baku City.

History

Baku Zoo opened in 1928 within an existing park named after Anatoly Lunacharsky (which has now been renamed after Nizami Ganjavi). In 1942, a new zoo was founded in the same location as the evacuated Rostov Zoo. The opening ceremony was held following the Great Patriotic War. Until 1958, the zoo was located near a railway station in a small square.

In 1958, the zoo was relocated to a town called Bayil on the outskirts of Baku, and remained there until the mid-1970s when a landslide killed a lion and a bear. As a result, the zoo was temporarily relocated to Bakikhanov (formerly Razin), where it remained until 1985. During this period a group of experts, including zoologists, biologists, and other specialists, decided that Narimanov Raion in Baku was the appropriate location for the zoo. Construction of the new zoo began near a railway station for children, and according to the plan, the zoo would cover .

In 1979, the government of Baku allocated the necessary funds for constructing the new zoo, which only lasted 5 years because of funding deficiencies. On September 1, 1985, the new Baku Zoo was reopened for visitors. In 2008, six species of exotic animals were flown to the zoo from Minsk: pairs of Nile crocodiles, South American coatis, chinchillas, roe deer, Egyptian dogs, and lynxes. This group of animals was exchanged for a young lion, which was sent from Baku to Minsk at the end of 2007.

Further construction was carried out in 2010. A new railway station for children was constructed, but issues related to the zoo's relocation were again raised.

The symbol of the Baku Zoo is the pink flamingo, adopted in the 1990s. The citizens of Baku would bring wounded flamingos to the zoo where its staff, led by veterinarian Chingiz Sultanov, tended to them. There are currently 28 flamingos in the zoo.

Plans for a New Zoo
Approximately 2.85 million Azerbaijani manats were allocated for the project. Rare mammal and bird species from different continents, especially Australia, are planned to be added to the new zoo, which will cover . A working group which includes specialists from different research institutes and NPOs was created within the Ministry of Ecology and Natural Resources and Azerbaijan National Academy of Sciences to manage the new species.

Animals
As of 2018, there were 160 species of animals in the zoo and about 1200 animals total:

Gallery

References

External links
 

Zoos in Azerbaijan
Buildings and structures in Baku
Tourist attractions in Baku
Zoos established in 1928
1928 establishments in the Transcaucasian Socialist Federative Soviet Republic